Hylopsar is a genus of African birds in the family Sturnidae.

Species

References

 
Taxa named by Hans von Boetticher